Kharumwa (Karumwa) is a town in Geita Region of northwestern Tanzania, East Africa.  It is the administrative centre for Nyang'hwale District.

History
Prior to 2012, Kharumwa was part of Geita District, Mwanza Region.

References

Populated places in Geita Region